The 1988 Alabama Crimson Tide football team (variously "Alabama", "Bama" or "The Tide") represented the University of Alabama in the 1988 NCAA Division I-A football season. It was the Crimson Tide's 96th overall and 55th season as a member of the Southeastern Conference (SEC). The team was led by head coach Bill Curry, in his second year, and played their home games at both Bryant–Denny Stadium in Tuscaloosa and Legion Field in Birmingham, Alabama. They finished the season with a record of nine wins and three losses (9–3 overall, 4–3 in the SEC) and with a victory in the Sun Bowl over Army.

Alabama suffered close losses to rivals LSU and Auburn in November but the low point of the season was a 22–12 loss on homecoming to Ole Miss, Alabama's first ever loss against Ole Miss in the state of Alabama. Alabama had zero yards passing in the game. Highlights included a victory over Penn State, Alabama's third consecutive victory over Tennessee, and a come-from-behind 29–28 victory in the Sun Bowl over Army in which quarterback David Smith threw for 412 yards, an all-time bowl record for an Alabama quarterback.

Alabama's road game against Texas A&M, originally scheduled for September 17, was postponed to December 1 when Coach Curry declined to make the trip, worried about oncoming Hurricane Gilbert. When Gilbert made landfall in Mexico and the weather in College Station was clear on gameday, A&M fans called Alabama's coach "Chicken Curry". Alabama won the rescheduled game on December 1 by a final score of 30–10.

Schedule

Roster

Season summary

Texas A&M

vs. Army (Sun Bowl)

1989 NFL Draft

References
General

 

Specific

Alabama
Alabama Crimson Tide football seasons
Sun Bowl champion seasons
Alabama Crimson Tide football